EB Games (formerly known as Electronics Boutique and EB World) is an American computer and video games retailer. First established as an American company in 1977 by James Kim with a single electronics-focused location in the King of Prussia mall near Philadelphia, the company has grown into an international corporation. EB Games's parent corporation, GameStop, has its headquarters in Grapevine, Texas, a suburb of Dallas. When Electronics Boutique was an independent company, its headquarters was in West Goshen Township, Pennsylvania, near West Chester.

The EB Games brand still operates in Australia and New Zealand. GameStop also operates certain stores under the EBX brand.

History
Originally, the operation mainly sold calculators and digital watches. Between 1977 and the mid-1990s, the company expanded to (and later stopped) selling computers, software, and other related items (according to the EB Games employee handbook). Electronics Boutique also operated stores under the name Games 'n Gadgets. The Games 'n Gadgets stores were more centered on entertainment and gaming, rather than business and productivity. In the mid-1990s, the company's focus switched to TV-based video games and consoles, though many stores still maintain PC game sections.

In May 2000, in order to unify their company, Electronics Boutique changed the vast majority of its current EB and EB Gameworld stores to the name EB Games. They also announced that they would be either closing or selling all of their EB Kids and Brandywine Sports Collectible Stores.

For years EB Games' primary distribution center was in Louisville, Kentucky, with two smaller distribution centers and a World Headquarters all located in West Chester, Pennsylvania. With video games becoming increasingly popular, EB Games decided it was time for a new distribution center. In October 2004, EB Games opened its doors to its new  distribution center in Sadsbury Township, Pennsylvania. The world headquarter office in West Chester remained open, however anyone working at the old distribution centers were transferred to the new location.

As of July 30, 2001, the company operated 2,280 stores in the United States (including Puerto Rico), Canada, United Kingdom, Australia, Austria, Denmark, Finland, Germany, Italy, New Zealand, Norway, Spain, and Sweden, primarily under the names EB Games and Electronics Boutique.

EB Games and GameStop merger
On Thursday, October 6, 2005, shareholders from EB Games and GameStop agreed to a $1.44 billion takeover deal. The deal offered $38.15 in cash as well as approximately ¾ of a share of GameStop stock for every 1 share of EB Games stock. This offer was a 34.2% premium on the $41.12 per share closing price of EB Games stock. GameStop decided to close EB Games's newly constructed distribution center in Sadsbury, PA, their call center in Las Vegas, NV, and their International Headquarters in West Chester, PA, eliminating more than 800 jobs. Only 65 former EB Games employees were offered jobs at GameStop's headquarters in Grapevine, TX.

International

EB began its international expansion with the opening of three stores in Toronto, Ontario, Canada in 1993. The Canadian division was the largest of the international divisions with over 300 stores as of May 2008.

In 1995, the company expanded to the UK with the purchase of 25% of the financially troubled British game retailer Rhino Group. The name of the chain was changed from Future Zone to "Electronics Boutique" to match the new owner. John Steinbrecher, Electronic Boutique's VP of Stores in the US and Canada, was seconded to the UK to manage the chain. Store remodels, product mix changes and used video games combined to restore the chain's finances.

Electronics Boutique commenced operations in Australia in 1997 and rapidly became the number one video game specialty retailer in the country and the only one with a nationwide footprint.

Although the merger created a company separate from the U.S. parent, EB retained a 24% ownership stake in the merged chain for a period of time and, under the merger agreement, collected substantial management fees from it until 2004, when the companies agreed to sever the remainder of their ties with a one time settlement. The GAME brand replaced the EB name at all former EB stores in the United Kingdom and Ireland. The new company was the biggest video game retailer in the United Kingdom. However, GameStop is once again operating in Ireland under the GameStop brand.

On May 23, 2005, EB Games announced a definitive agreement to acquire Jump, a retailer based in Valencia, Spain that sells PCs and other consumer electronics. EB Games plans to begin introducing video game hardware and software into Jump's 141 stores over the next several months. The acquisition provides EB Games entry into the Spanish marketplace and continues EB Games's aggressive international expansion.

In July 2008, EB Games announced an agreement to acquire The Gamesman, which was the largest independently owned chain of video game stores in New Zealand.

On July 28, 2021, EB Games announced that its Canadian operations would be rebranded under the GameStop name, with the rebranding expected to be completed by the end of 2021. Stores began to be converted to GameStop signage by September 2021.

See also

 GameStop
 EB Games Australia
 EB Games Expo
 Game (retailer)

References

External links

 
 
 

Video game retailers of the United States
Companies based in Chester County, Pennsylvania
West Goshen Township, Chester County, Pennsylvania
Retail companies established in 1977
American companies established in 1977
GameStop
1977 establishments in Pennsylvania
2005 mergers and acquisitions